In topology, a branch of mathematics, a cosheaf with values in an ∞-category C that admits colimits is a functor F from the category of open subsets of a topological space X (more precisely its nerve) to C such that
(1) The F of the empty set is the initial object.
(2) For any increasing sequence  of open subsets with union U, the canonical map  is an equivalence.

The basic example is  where on the right is the singular chain complex of U with coefficients in an abelian group A.

Example: If f is a continuous map, then  is a cosheaf.

See also 
sheaf (mathematics)

Notes

References 
http://www.math.harvard.edu/~lurie/282ynotes/LectureVIII-Poincare.pdf
http://arxiv.org/pdf/1303.3255v1.pdf , section 3, in particular Thm 3.10 p. 34

Algebraic topology
Category theory
Sheaf theory